Paloma Ford is an American R&B vocalist. She gained traction singing backgrounds for singer Macy Gray on her 2007 album Big and has since gone on to carve out a lane for herself as a R&B singer, songwriter & collaborate with the likes of Meek Mill, Tory Lanez and Rick Ross. She has also gained popularity for original songs like "W.E.T.," "Jada," and "Hit of You" from her 2016 debut EP Nearly Civizled. Ford states Michael and Janet Jackson, Prince, Nirvana, and Beyoncé as influences and named 2Pac, Aaliyah and Sade as being in her top 5 artists of all time.

Career

2013–2014: Music Debut, Collaborations 
Paloma Ford released her music videos for her songs "Ménage à Trois" and "Hit Of You" in 2013, which both became successful on YouTube. In 2014, she was featured on Meek Mill's single "I Don't Know". The single was released on iTunes on May 19, 2014.  It peaked at #35 on Billboards Hot R&B/Hip-Hop Songs chart and #21 on the Hot Rap Songs chart. She released her song featuring Snoop Dogg and Iamsu! entitled "Summer In California" in August 2014.

2014–Present: Debut EP Nearly Civilized, X Tapes  
In 2016, Ford released her debut EP, Nearly Civilized, which received acclaim for tracks "W.E.T." and "Jada." Ford also released an array of standalone tracks, including 2017's "Waves" featuring Dave East as she assembled her second EP X Tapes. Ford returned in August 2020 with her sophomore EP, X Tapes, which included the song "All for Nothing" featuring Rick Ross. The project garnered attention from LA Weekly, Flaunt Magazine, Notion Magazine, Revolt TV, Hot New Hip Hop  and was coined "one of the most exciting projects to listen to," by L'Officiel. For the lead track of the project "All For Nothing" featuring Rick Ross, the single was highlighted by UPROXX as "the best R&B track released for the week"  when the project premiered and "nothing short of dazzling" by Paper Magazine.

Discography

EPs
 Nearly Civilized (2016)
  X Tapes  (2020)

Singles
 "Dollars" (2012)
 "Mènage à Trois" (2013)
 "Right Now" (2013)
 "Hit Of You" (2013)
 "Lap Dance" (2014)
 "Let Me See" (feat. Meek Mill) (2014)
 "Summer In California" (feat. Snoop Dogg & Iamsu) (2014)
 "Jada" (2015)
 "Do It Again" (2015)
 "Wet" (2016)
 "That Shit Ain't Cool" (2017)
 "Waves" (feat. Dave East) (2017)
 "4 the Fame" (2018)
 "Rain" (2019) 
 "Chrome" 'In My Feelings Version'(2020)
 "Nights I Cry" (2020)
 "All For Nothing"(feat. Rick Ross) (2020)

References

21st-century American singers
American hip hop musicians
Living people
People from Long Beach, California
21st-century American women singers
Year of birth missing (living people)